Octavian George Popescu (born 27 December 2002) is a Romanian professional footballer who plays as a winger or an attacking midfielder for Liga I club FCSB and the Romania national team.

After playing junior football for Rapid București and Universitatea Craiova among others, Popescu recorded his professional debut with FCSB in 2020, at age 17.

Internationally, he made his senior debut for Romania in a 0–1 friendly loss to Greece in March 2022. He previously represented the nation at under-21 and under-23 levels.

Club career

Early career
Popescu started practising football at age eight with the team of his local high school from Nucet, Dâmbovița County. In 2014, he moved to Regal Sport București, where he was teammates with Radu Drăgușin and Luca Florică among others. The capital-based club loaned him out to Rapid București and Universitatea Craiova, respectively, before Popescu joined FCSB in 2020.

FCSB
Popescu was loaned out by FCSB to second tier side Turris Turnu Măgurele on 20 August 2020, but was immediately recalled to his parent club after general manager Mihai Stoica and owner Gigi Becali found out the deal was agreed over their heads. One month later, aged 17, he made his professional debut for FCSB by coming on for Robert Ion in the 50th minute of a 3–0 Liga I win over Argeș Pitești.

Popescu scored his first career goal and also provided an assist on 30 January 2021, in a 3–1 defeat of Politehnica Iași at the Arena Națională. On 15 April 2021, he started in a 1–4 penalty shoot-out loss to CFR Cluj in the Supercupa României. FCSB also lost the national title to the latter opponent, and he ended his first season as a senior with four goals from 34 appearances in all competitions.

On 25 July 2021, Popescu scored in a 4–1 league defeat of his former youth team Universitatea Craiova, and on 12 September netted in a 6–0 derby thrashing of Dinamo București. In January 2022, he opened the scoring in successive fixtures against CFR Cluj and Dinamo București, which ended in a 3–3 draw and a 3–0 win, respectively. Popescu scored the only goal of a championship play-off match against CFR Cluj on 17 April, representing FCSB's first win at the Dr. Constantin Rădulescu Stadium in almost eight years.

At the start of the 2022–23 campaign, he switched his shirt number from 9 to 11, but at the end of July was handed the number 10 jersey and also appointed vice-captain as a result of Florin Tănase's imminent departure.

International career

Popescu did not represent Romania at any level prior to 2021, in spite of being considered a talented prospect. He made his debut for the under-21 side in March 2021, aged 18, after entering as a substitute in the UEFA European Championship group stage matches against Hungary and Germany, which ended 2–1 and 0–0, respectively.

In June 2021, Popescu featured for the under-23 team in friendlies against Mexico and Australia, but was later not allowed by FCSB to participate in the postponed 2020 Summer Olympics. On 25 March 2022, 19-year-old Popescu was handed his full debut for Romania in a 0–1 exhibition loss to Greece at the Stadionul Steaua, being brought on for Alexandru Mitriță in the 62nd minute.

Player profile

Style of play
Popescu's best attributes are his pace and acceleration, while at the same time possesses appreciable dribbling skills and creativity. He is able to strike the ball with both feet, and has been deployed in the centre as an attacking midfielder or wide as a winger.

Reception
Popescu's breakthrough in FCSB's senior team was highly regarded by Romanian pundits; Cornel Dinu described him as a "very talented kid of extraordinary quality" who "has similarities to Florea Dumitrache", Gabi Balint stated he is a quick-thinking genius "just like [Gheorghe] Hagi was", and Basarab Panduru emphasised his versatility. Dinu continued his praises and compared him to Adrian Mutu, considering Popescu can have a much more successful career.

His former coach Daniel Pancu regarded him a "fantastic talent", while Dorinel Munteanu said that he is a "youngster who looks different from what we have in Romania" and that from his "generation, from [Gheorghe] Hagi—not even from Adrian Mutu, but from Hagi" he has "never seen such a lightness to play in depth or to provide the final pass". When discussing his weaknesses, Gabi Balint noted in February 2021 that Popescu should become more consistent during the full 90 minutes and build muscle mass, and the following year Ioan Sabău made a similar remark.

Career statistics

Club

International

Honours
FCSB
Supercupa României runner-up: 2020

Individual
Gazeta Sporturilor Romania Player of the Month: March 2022

References

External links

FCSB official profile 

2002 births
Living people
Sportspeople from Târgoviște
Romanian footballers
Association football midfielders
Association football wingers
Liga I players
FC Steaua București players
AFC Turris-Oltul Turnu Măgurele players
Romania under-21 international footballers
Olympic footballers of Romania
Romania international footballers